The 2018 Men's International Hockey Open is a men's field hockey tournament being held at the Marrara Hockey Centre. It will take place between 18 – 22 September 2018 in Darwin, Australia. A total of four teams will compete for the title.

Teams
A total of four teams competed for the title:

Head coach: Germán Orozco

Head coach: Colin Batch

Head coach: Siegfried Aikman

Head coach: Amin Rahim

Results

Pool matches

Classification matches

Third and fourth place

Final

Statistics

Final standings

Goalscorers

References

See also
Hockey Australia
International Hockey Federation

International Hockey Open
International field hockey competitions hosted by Australia
International Hockey Open Men
Sport in Darwin, Northern Territory
International Hockey Open Men
2010s in the Northern Territory